Coquille  is a city in, and the county seat of, Coos County, Oregon, United States. The population was 4,015 at the 2020 census. The primary economic base is the timber industry. The city derives its name from the Coquille Native American tribe.

Geography and climate

Coquille is bordered by the Coquille River which drains part of the Coastal Range into the Pacific Ocean at Bandon.

According to the Köppen climate classification, Coquille has a warm-summer Mediterrean climate (Csb).

Demographics

2010 census
As of the census of 2010, there were 3,866 people, 1,640 households, and 1,036 families living in the city. The racial makeup of the city was 92.5% White, 0.4% African American, 1.9% Native American, 0.5% Asian, 0.1% Pacific Islander, 1.7% from other races, and 2.9% from two or more races. Hispanic or Latino of any race were 5.3% of the population.

There were 1,640 households, of which 26.7% had children under the age of 18 living with them, 48.0% were married couples living together, 11.3% had a female householder with no husband present, 3.9% had a male householder with no wife present, and 36.8% were non-families. 31.2% of all households were made up of individuals, and 15.4% had someone living alone who was 65 years of age or older. The average household size was 2.30 and the average family size was 2.84.

The median age in the city was 45.5 years. 20.7% of residents were under the age of 18; 7.6% were between the ages of 18 and 24; 21.2% were from 25 to 44; 29.9% were from 45 to 64; and 20.6% were 65 years of age or older. The gender makeup of the city was 48.8% male and 51.2% female.

2000 census

As of the census of 2000, there were 4,184 people, 1,686 households, and 1,129 families living in the city. The population density was 1,538.3 people per square mile (593.9/km). There were 1,850 housing units at an average density of 680.2 per square mile (262.6/km). The racial makeup of the city was 92.64% White, 0.50% African American, 1.77% Native American, 0.36% Asian, 0.14% Pacific Islander, 1.60% from other races, and 2.99% from two or more races. Hispanic or Latino of any race were 4.09% of the population.

There were 1,686 households, out of which 28.2% had children under the age of 18 living with them, 51.1% were married couples living together, 12.0% had a female householder with no husband present, and 33.0% were non-families. 28.1% of all households were made up of individuals, and 14.8% had someone living alone who was 65 years of age or older. The average household size was 2.35 and the average family size was 2.83.

In the city, the population dispersal was 22.9% under the age of 18, 7.4% from 18 to 24, 25.3% from 25 to 44, 24.1% from 45 to 64, and 20.1% who were 65 years of age or older. The median age was 42 years. For every 100 females, there were 94.3 males. For every 100 females age 18 and over, there were 91.8 males.

The median income for a household in the city was $29,931, and the median income for a family was $35,144. Males had a median income of $34,583 versus $21,567 for females. The per capita income for the city was $14,619. About 7.6% of families and 10.6% of the population were below the poverty line, including 15.3% of those under age 18 and 6.1% of those age 65 or over.

Museums and other points of interest

The Coquille Valley Historical Society established the Coquille Valley Museum in May 2005. It features exhibits of tools, antiques, books, photographs, and other materials.

On summer weekends, local volunteers perform in melodramas at the Sawdust Theatre in Coquille. First opened in 1966 and destroyed by fire in 1994, the theater reopened in 2000.

The old City Hall, built in 1912, has been restored, by its owners, Nella and Steve Abbott, and transformed into a gallery featuring art created by prisoners.

Education
The Coquille School District provides K–12 public education for residents of the area. The Lincoln School of Early Learning, Coquille Valley Elementary, Winter Lakes Elementary School, Winter Lakes High School, and Coquille Junior Senior High are all part of the Coquille School District. Southwestern Oregon Community College in nearby Coos Bay offers two-year associate degrees and other academic programs.

See also
Steamboats of the Coquille River

References

External links
Entry for Coquille in the Oregon Blue Book

Cities in Oregon
Cities in Coos County, Oregon
County seats in Oregon
1883 establishments in Oregon
Populated places established in 1883
Oregon placenames of Native American origin